The Miller Creek Bridge is a historic bridge, carrying Miller Creek Road across Miller Creek, just north of the city limits of Batesville, Arkansas. Built in 1914, it is the state's oldest surviving concrete bridge. The bridge is somewhat overengineered, as the use of concrete in bridge construction was then relatively new, and knowledge of the material's properties in this application was not well understood.

The bridge was listed on the National Register of Historic Places in 2010.

See also
List of bridges documented by the Historic American Engineering Record in Arkansas
List of bridges on the National Register of Historic Places in Arkansas
National Register of Historic Places listings in Independence County, Arkansas

References

External links

Road bridges on the National Register of Historic Places in Arkansas
Bridges completed in 1914
Historic American Engineering Record in Arkansas
National Register of Historic Places in Independence County, Arkansas
Concrete bridges in the United States
Arch bridges in the United States
1914 establishments in Arkansas